Internet e-mail functions through the use of Internet Standards.  Although many more standards actually apply to e-mail, virtually all mail servers and e-mail clients support at least the following basic set.
 SMTP (or ) specifies the protocol by which e-mail is transmitted
  specifies the basic format for e-mail
 MIME supplements the e-mail formatting rules to allow non-English text in both e-mail headers and bodies, and defines a mechanism for including non-textual attachments in e-mail bodies
 POP3 and IMAP4 specify e-mail retrieval protocols used by e-mail clients

See also
 Internet standard

External links
 Internet Mail Consortium's list of e-mail standards